Buscemi is the nickname of the Belgian DJ Dirk Swartenbroekx. His style can be described as dance music with a touch of Latino, with among others lounge, house, jazz, Brazilian grooves, afrobeat and drum and bass.

The CD Camino Real contains house music with funk and Latin influences. Artists like Isabelle Antena, Ted Milton and Michael Franti cooperated in the production of this CD. On the CD Late Nite Reworks Vol. 1 different mixes can be heard.

Buscemi not only brings out his music on hard disk but also performs live sets, supported by his band with drummer Luuk Cox, bass Hans Mullens and trumpetteer Sam Versweyveld. As such, they appeared multiple times at Rock Werchter, I Love Techno, Ten Days Off, Pukkelpop, Gentse Feesten, Dour Festival, Zeverrock and many other festivals.

Buscemi also produced the soundtrack of the Belgian drama series De Rodenburgs, a TV series about the intrigues between two rich families in Kortrijk.

In the summer of 2011, he scored a hit ("O Sarracino") together with Rocco Granata.

Discography

Albums

Singles

References

External links
Official website

Living people
Belgian DJs
Year of birth missing (living people)
Blue Note Records artists